Seidy López is a Mexican-American actress and director.

López is best known for her starring debut in the critically acclaimed film Mi Vida Loca. She appeared in Solo, the hit film Selena, an episode of ER directed by Quentin Tarantino, and in Showtime's Resurrection Boulevard. López co-starred in Luminarias and The Elián González Story for the Fox Family Channel, and starred in Blink of an Eye. She also recently directed her first film, American Born, which is in post-production.

Early life
Seidy López was born in Mérida, Yucatán, Mexico. At the age of four, she and her family moved to the United States in search of a more rewarding life.
When she turned ten, her parents found it necessary to return to Yucatán with their three children in order to learn how to properly read, write and speak the Spanish language. The López family returned to the States two years later with their children completely bilingual.

Career

Seidy's experience as a performer began at age 12 when she formed a singing group called "Sensation". The group won several talent competitions in Los Angeles. At the age of 14 she decided to focus on her vocal skills, and with the help of her Jr. High teacher, Mr. Gleason, she auditioned for the Los Angeles County High School for the Arts at California State University. As a member of their vocal ensemble, Seidy was given the opportunity to perform in such prestigious venues as the Dorothy Chandler Pavilion. The following year at Hollywood High School of the Performing Arts, Seidy discovered theater and focused her attention on acting. At the age of seventeen Seidy also became a member of an educational theater troupe called "Project Able". The theater troupe toured venues throughout California, including jails and juvenile halls, teaching AIDS education.

Seidy's big break came in 1993 when Alison Anders cast her as Mousie in her critically acclaimed movie Mi Vida Loca,

Starring in this film helped Seidy gain recognition in the Latino community and gave her the opportunity to work with other directors such as Quentin Tarantino, Joel Schumacher and Antoine Fuqua. She has appeared in many of Gregory Nava's films, such as Mi Familia and Selena when she played Debra. Nava later reunited her with Esai Morales in his series American Family. Seidy's career has continued with roles such as Cindy in the film Luminarias, Elian's mother in The Elian Gonzales Story, Gabriela in the self-titled film, and the bakery girl Cynthia Limon in the television series Resurrection Blvd.

She once again plays a character close to Selena Quintanilla, this time as the late singer's mother in the Netflix Original Series, Selena: The Series.

Personal life
Seidy lives with her husband and two children in Los Angeles, California.

Filmography

Actress

Director credits

References

External links

Seidy López cast Interview from the movie Gabriela
Seidy López interview for qvMagazine
Mi-vida-loca clip

American film actresses
American television actresses
American actresses of Mexican descent
Mexican emigrants to the United States
People from Mérida, Yucatán
Actresses from Yucatán (state)
Living people
Los Angeles County High School for the Arts alumni
Year of birth missing (living people)
21st-century American women